The 2023 Fórmula Nacional Argentina is a multi-event, Formula Renault 2.0 open-wheel single seater motor racing championship. The championship features a mix of professional and amateur drivers. This championship was held under the Formula Renault Argentina moniker from 1980. This is the second season held under the Fórmula Nacional Argentina moniker.

The season started on 24 February.

Teams and drivers 
All drivers compete with cars using a Tito-built chassis and a 2000cc Renault engine.

Race calendar 
The first round of the 2023 calendar was announced on 5 January 2023. Further rounds will be concretized at a later date.

Race results

Championship standings

Scoring system 
Every driver taking part in qualifying or in one of the two races of a weekend and setting a time is awarded five points.

Qualifying points 
Each qualifying session awards one point to the fastest driver. Afterwards, the five fastest drivers take part in the "super qualifying" session, each setting one lap to set the top five positions. These five drivers are also awarded points:

Race points

Drivers' Championship

Teams' Championship

References

External links 

 

Fórmula Nacional Argentina
Fórmula Nacional Argentina
Fórmula Nacional Argentina
Fórmula Nacional Argentina